opened in Kyoto, Japan, in 2003. The Ōtani University collection, which relates in particular to Shin Buddhist culture, includes ten Important Cultural Properties.

See also
 Kyoto National Museum
 Daitoku-ji

References

External links

 Ōtani University Facilities
  Collection

Museums in Kyoto
Museums established in 2003
2003 establishments in Japan